Within the Law may refer to:

 Within the Law (play), a play by Bayard Veiller
 Several movies based on Veiller's play:
 Within the Law (1916 film), an Australian silent film directed by Monte Luke
 Within the Law (1917 film), an American silent film directed by William P. S. Earle
 Within the Law (1923 film), an American silent film directed by Frank Lloyd 
 Within the Law (1939 film), an American film directed by Gustav Machatý